Kim W. Stallwood (born 1955) is a British animal rights advocate, author, independent scholar, and consultant. He is European director of the Animals and Society Institute, an animal rights think tank. He was executive editor of The Animals' Agenda, an animal rights magazine (1993–2002), and is the editor of Speaking Out for Animals (2001) and A Primer on Animal Rights (2002). Stallwood blogs under the name Grumpy Vegan.

Life and work 
Stallwood was born and raised in Camberley, Surrey, England.

Stallwood is a former national director of People for the Ethical Treatment of Animals (1987–1992), campaigns officer for the British Union for the Abolition of Vivisection (1981–1985), and national organizer for Compassion in World Farming (1976–1978), for which he remains a consultant.

He was also the founder of the Animal Rights Network (ARN), the world's largest library on animal rights, which became the Animals and Society Institute.

In 2013, Stallwood published his first book, Growl: Life Lessons, Hard Truths, and Bold Strategies from an Animal Advocate, with Lantern Books. The book featured a foreword by Brian May.

References

Further reading

External links

Grumpy Vegan blog
Animals and Society Institute
Protecting Animals 25: Kim Stallwood

Living people
1955 births
Anti-vivisectionists
British activists
British animal rights activists
British animal rights scholars
British bloggers
British non-fiction writers
British veganism activists
People from Hastings